Kenneth D. Poss (born 1971 in Green Bay, Wisconsin) is an American biologist and currently James B. Duke Professor of Cell Biology and director of the Regeneration Next Initiative at the Duke University School of Medicine (Durham, North Carolina).

Career 
Poss received a B.A. in Biology from Carleton College (Minnesota) in 1992, and a Ph.D. in Biology in 1998 from Massachusetts Institute of Technology working with Susumu Tonegawa. Poss did postdoctoral research with Mark Keating, first at University of Utah and then at Harvard Medical School. Poss became faculty in the Department of Cell Biology at Duke University in 2003.

Research 
Poss uses zebrafish to understand how and why tissue regeneration occurs. As a postdoc, he led the first positional cloning of a gene required for regeneration of amputated fins, and he established zebrafish as a model for innate heart regeneration.  With the latter discovery, it became clear that heart regeneration occurs and is efficient in some vertebrates, and that it could be dissected using molecular genetics in a tractable model system. Since then, he and his postdocs, students, and staff have innovated many tools to interrogate tissue regeneration.  Poss reported that heart muscle cells, not stem cells, are activated by injury to divide and directly replace lost cardiac tissue.  His lab has a history of research findings on the outer layer of the heart called the epicardium, beginning with discovery of its dynamism upon injury, to its fate-mapping, to its roles in releasing pro-regenerative factors, and to studies describing its own regenerative capacity.  His group applied Brainbow-based technology to demonstrate that particularly high proliferative activity by a small number of muscle cells, known as clonal dominance, creates the structure of the adult heart.  His lab also identified a key factor important for the process by which zebrafish regenerate spinal cord tissue to reverse a paralyzing injury.  Recently, he introduced the concept of tissue regeneration enhancer elements (TREEs), sequences that regulate regeneration programs and can be engineered to enhance tissue regeneration.

Awards 
Poss was a Helen Hay Whitney Foundation Postdoctoral Fellow, a Pew Scholar, and a Howard Hughes Medical Institute Early Career Scientist. He received the Established Investigator and Merit Awards from the American Heart Association, the Ruth and A. Morris Williams Faculty Research Prize from Duke University, and the Distinguished Achievement Award from Carleton College.  Poss was named a Fellow of the American Association for the Advancement of Science.

Selected studies, videos and interviews 
Seed Funding Helps Grow Collaboration in Regenerative Biology and Medicine
MDI Biological Lab: Dr. Ken Poss discusses how zebrafish are playing an important role in understanding regeneration and heart disease.
International Journal of Developmental Biology:  Interview with Ken Poss
The Economist:  Rainbow's beginning
AAAS:  Do Zebrafish Hold an Ingredient to Heal Spinal Cord Injuries?
Nature:  Heart under construction
Leica:  Organ Regeneration: An Unlikely Fish Tale

References

External links 
Duke University Cell Biology Department
Poss Lab
Zebrafish Information Network: ZFIN
Regeneration Next Initiative

American biologists
1971 births
Living people